Edvard Hagerup Bull (10 June 1922 – 15 March 2012) was a Norwegian composer.

He was born in Bergen.  He grew up in Jar outside Oslo in a musical and politically active family, the son of Sverre Hagerup Bull and his wife Aldis Jebsen. His paternal grandfather was politician and judge Edvard Hagerup Bull. During September 1955 he married Anna Kvarme.

Bull studied at the Norwegian Academy of Music in Oslo and at the Conservatoire de Paris  where he won the 1952 . He was awarded the prize for musical composition from the Conservatoire National Supérieur de Musique de Paris. He had additional training with the Austrian-born musicologist, Josef Rufer. Other teachers include Jean Rivier and Olivier Messiaen. His teacher Darius Milhaud described him as "a musician with a solid technique and a truly very enthralling, vigorous and highly imaginative personality".

Edvard Hagerup Bull became a notable composer.  He wrote two operas and thirty orchestral works and chamber music.

Selected works
Den standhaftige tindsoldat, 1948–49
Sinfonia di Teatro  1950
Escapades, orkestersuite, 1952
Marionettes sérieuses,  1960
Epilogue for strykere, 1961
Münchhausen, 1961
Accents for klaver, 1968
Fløytekonsert, 1969
Fyrtøiet, 1973–74
Den grimme ælling, 1972–77
Variantes multi-métriques for klaver, 1975
Chant d'Hommage à Jean Rivier for orkester, 1976
Prélude con Fuoco for klaver, 1978
Den Grimme Ælling (Opera) 1972–77
Fyrtøyet (Opera) 1973–74

References

20th-century Norwegian composers
21st-century Norwegian composers
Norwegian classical composers
Norwegian Academy of Music alumni
Norwegian expatriates in France
Musicians from Bergen
Musicians from Bærum
1922 births
2012 deaths